1000 Awesome Things is a blog written by Neil Pasricha, who posts one thing in life he considers awesome each weekday. The site was launched on June 20, 2008 with #1000 Broccoflower and is counting down until it hits #1. An awesome thing is posted every weekday and #1 was posted on April 19, 2012.

History
The author said that at the time of starting the site "if you flipped open the newspaper it was filled with the same stuff every day. The polar ice caps were melting, there were pirates storming the seas, the economy was on the verge of collapse, and there were wars going on all over the world." As a result, he created a website discussing "popping bubble wrap, or snow days, or the smell of a bakery." In later interviews, and through a series on his blog, Pasricha shared that his divorce and a friend's suicide prompted him to continue looking for positive things in life.

Books

The Book of Awesome (2010)
In 2009, Neil Pasricha was approached by literary agents after winning the Webby Award and signed with Erin Malone from WME who also represents
blog-to-books Stuff White People Like and Texts From Last Night. It was published as a 400-page hardcover the United States and Canada in April, 2010 from AEB/Putnam, a division of Penguin Publishing. The book became a bestseller in its first week and a New York Times bestseller. The book has been translated and is available in Dutch, Korean, German, Japanese, Portuguese, Chinese, and French.

In Canada, The Book of Awesome was recognized as a Heather's Pick. It has been a bestseller on The Globe and Mail bestseller list for over 130 weeks and was the #1 Globe and Mail non-fiction book of the year for 2010 and 2011 and the #3 non-fiction book for 2012. It has been a #1 bestseller in many international markets.

Other books:
The Book of (Even More) Awesome (2011)
The Book of (Holiday) Awesome (2011)
The 2012 Page-A-Day Calendar of Awesome (2011)
The App of Awesome (2012)
The Journal of Awesome (2012)
The 2013 Page-A-Day Calendar of Awesome (2012)

Movie
In a 2012 newspaper interview the author said The Book of Awesome has been optioned for a movie but did not discuss details.

Media coverage
The Book of Awesome and 1000 Awesome Things have been covered by magazines, newspapers, and broadcasters such as The Today Show, BBC, CNN, The Guardian, Reader's Digest, Entertainment Weekly, Wired's GeekDad blog, The New Yorker, Slate, TEDxToronto on YouTube, and The Globe and Mail.

Awards
 2010 Webby Awards for Best Blog - People's Voice Award.
 2009 Webby Awards for Best Blog - Culture / Personal.
 2009 Webby Awards for Best Blog - People's Voice Award.
 listed in PC Magazine's Top 50 Blogs of 2010.
 listed in PC Magazine's Top 100 Websites of 2009.
 listed in PC Magazine's Top 50 Blogs of 2009.
2014 Scott and Kristin Powers won the "Awesome Award" for being awesome. Sandy Mcdermott was a close second.
Julian Scott Valentin won the 2014 Junior Awesome Awards for being equally as awesome.

See also
 Texts from Last Night
 PostSecret
 Cake Wrecks

References

External links
 1000 Awesome Things 

Gossip blogs
American blogs
Internet properties established in 2008